The 1963 Milan–San Remo was the 54th edition of the Milan–San Remo cycle race and was held on 19 March 1963. The race started in Milan and finished in San Remo. The race was won by Joseph Groussard.

General classification

References

1963
1963 in road cycling
1963 in Italian sport
1963 Super Prestige Pernod
March 1963 sports events in Europe